Dan Brooks (born June 25, 1951) is a former American football coach and player.

Playing career
Brooks played as a defensive lineman for Appalachian State University from 1969 to 1972, before transferring to Western Carolina University in 1973.

Coaching career

Clemson
From 2009 to 2016 he served as the defensive tackles coach for Clemson University. During the 2016 season, Brooks was named AFCA Division I FBS Assistant Coach of the Year by the American Football Coaches Association. After the 2016 season, he retired from being a college football coach.

References

External links
 Tigernet.com profile

1951 births
Living people
People from Alleghany County, North Carolina
Players of American football from North Carolina
Appalachian State Mountaineers football players
Western Carolina Catamounts football players
Coaches of American football from North Carolina
Florida Gators football coaches
North Carolina Tar Heels football coaches
Tennessee Volunteers football coaches
Clemson Tigers football coaches